Phil A. Griego (born August 5, 1948)  is an American politician and a Democratic former member of the New Mexico Senate, representing the 39th District since 1997. He resigned in March 2015.

Convicted of corruption in 2017.

References

External links 
 Senator Phil A. Griego - (D) at New Mexico Legislature
 Senator Phil A. Griego (NM) at Project Vote Smart
 Follow the Money – Phil A Griego
 2008 2006 2004 2002 2000 1996 campaign contributions

1948 births
Living people
Democratic Party New Mexico state senators
New Mexico politicians convicted of crimes
Hispanic and Latino American state legislators in New Mexico